Pretty Ugly is the debut studio album by Scratcha DVA. It was released 19 March 2012 through Hyperdub.

Production
It was recorded in London, Cape Town, and Atlanta.

Critical reception
Pitchfork wrote that the album "wears its polemical heart on its sleeve, offering a manifesto for an approach to dance music that looks askew, glances awry, and always moves out of kilter." The Quietus wrote that Pretty Ugly contains "a decent scattering of funky-ish house tracks," while allowing Scratcha DVA the opportunity to be more "stylistically divergent." BBC Music called it "an exhilarating debut album from Leon Smart’s DVA alias, full of complexity." Exclaim! wrote that the album's "decidedly upbeat atmosphere dodges any pattern or semblance."

Track listing

References

2012 debut albums
Scratcha DVA albums